General elections were held in Belgium on 27 November 1932.
The Catholic Party won 79 of the 187 seats in the Chamber of Representatives and 42 of the 93 seats in the Senate. Voter turnout was 94.3%.

Background

The elections occurred during an economic crisis, the Great Depression. The Catholic-Liberal government led by Jules Renkin faced rising unemployment, derailing public finances and strikes benefiting the Communist Party. Parliamentary elections were due in May 1933 at the latest. On 18 October 1932, Prime Minister Renkin resigned under pressure from King Albert I, allowing the more experienced Charles de Broqueville to take charge. He immediately dissolved parliament and scheduled parliamentary elections for 27 November 1932.

Municipal elections had also occurred on 9 October 1932, where the Catholic Party lost ground to socialists and liberals. To avoid losses during the parliamentary elections, de Broqueville used the issue of education in the election campaign, which was a major issue under his previous 1911–1918 government.

His strategy worked; the Catholics won, but also the socialists and communists gained ground, whereas the liberals lost seats. The socialists refused to enter government, and the Catholic-Liberal coalition continued their government and proceeded to take drastic measures for economic recovery.

Results

Chamber of Representatives

Senate

References

Belgium
1930s elections in Belgium
1932 in Belgium
November 1932 events